Preta Maria Gadelha Gil Moreira (born 8 August 1974), known as Preta Gil, is a Brazilian singer and actress. She is the daughter of Gilberto Gil, a musician and former Minister of Culture in Brazil.

Biography 
In 1974, Gil's father, singer Gilberto Gil, went to a government office to register his daughter's name after his own mother's name. On arrival, the clerk informed him he was unable to register Preta as a name for his daughter. Gilberto Gil began to protest, "Why not? There's Branca (white), Clara (clear) and Rosa (rose) . . . why can't Preta (black) be a name?" The clerk would only agree if the name Preta accompanied a Catholic name. Thus, Gilberto Gil had to register his daughter under the name Preta Maria.

While Gil initially lived in Rio de Janeiro, she moved to Salvador at the age of one. Soon after, her mother, Sandra, had another daughter named Maria. Gil always believed that the decision to use the name Maria was the result of a lack of creativity. Gil also had an older brother, Pedro, who was born in London during her father's exile from Brazil. Gilberto Gil had left Brazil along with his friend, fellow singer Caetano Veloso, because a military dictatorship was in power.

Sandra's mother was also the mother of Andréa Gadelha who is best known as Dedé, the wife of Caetano Veloso. Sandra's mother believed that her two daughters married crazy men. Both Gilberto Gil and Veloso were exiled and went to live in London, leaving Preta's grandmother to raise the children. She has great admiration for her grandmother, who stood firm at a chaotic time in her family's life.

Since childhood, Gil has had a very vivid imagination. She had an imaginary puppy when she was five. When her father made a record in Los Angeles with Sérgio Mendes, the family moved to California, where they lived for eight months. Gil's mother joked that the airplane that took them to Los Angeles was a slave ship since she and her children were black. Gil's siblings, Maria and Pedro, both had curly hair, and Gil has straight hair—Veloso used to call her Filipina.

Gil was in Rio de Janeiro at the height of the 1980s when Bombando, Blitz, Paralamas, Barão Vermelho, and Lulu Santos were popular. The Brazilian music scene in the 1980s was very striking. As a daughter of one of Brazil's music icons, Gil had backstage access to the craziness of that music scene. Gil said of these experiences: "It all made me crazy, loved this environment, I felt comfortable. The stage was one thing that attracted me a lot."

She wanted to be the character, "Chacrete," in the TV show Chacrinha. She spent every Saturday in the Fenix theater or the Botanical Garden. Gil's father, her uncle Veloso, and her godmother Gal Costa all ranked on music charts around this time. All three would go to tapings of the show Chacrinha. Gil would always beg her mother to ask her father, her uncle, and even her godmother to let her attend a taping of the show. One day, she was permitted to attend. When she went into her uncle Caetano's dressing room and saw all of the costumes and instruments, she thought that he was the male version of Carmen Miranda. When the taping began, she watched the "magic" happen from a corner. She loved Elke Maravilha who was a constant fixture on the show. That was the environment of the 1980s: effervescent, colorful, and full of life. This was the moment when she decided to become a singer and an actress. She would imitate her godmother, Gal Costa, and other reputable and talented singers and actresses that she loved like Rita Lee and Elba Ramalho.

In March 2020, she contracted COVID-19.

In July 2020, she declared herself as pansexual.

In addition to being the daughter of Gilberto Gil, she is the first cousin of the singer and musician Moreno Veloso (son of Caetano Veloso with his first wife, Andrea Gadelha) and the second cousin of actress Patricia Pillar and pop singer Luiza Possi. She is also related to popular Brazilian rock singer Marina Lima.

Career

2003–2004: The First CD "Prêt-à-Porter" 
The first studio album, entitled "Prêt-à Porter" was released in 2003. Gil took nude pictures for the cover and the booklet of the CD. The idea was for the singer, in particular, to feel reborn.

Once Gil finished photographing the pictures, she showed them to the label. But the record label was alerted and asked if she was sure that she wanted to use them because it might cause a 'scandal'. Innocently, Gil said that since she had to include other singers on the disc, singers who were also naked on the covers of their CDs, would help to make here less controversial.

In a TV interview for GNT, the program Annoying "Fernanda Young", Gil said, she liked to be fun and relaxed which, with all certainty wouldn't have been a problem if she were thin.

2005–2010: Second CD "Preta", "Noite Preta" tour and first live DVD 

Gil's second studio album, entitled Preta, was released in September 2005. The CD contained two songs, "Very Dangerous" and "You and Mene, You and Me", both released in 2005.

In 2008, Gil debuted her new tour, called "Noite Preta", where on 20 October 2009, recorded her first live DVD/Blu-ray, scheduled for release on 17 July 2010.

"I'm thinking about launching an extra DVD with only the prohibited. In my day today, I'm very different from the "Preta Gil character, "one that people know the stage. Say the Preta woman from the stage is a more liberal without locks on the tongue, foul mouth like that," Gil told the EGO.

Waiting for the 2010 FIFA World Cup through the pre-release first live DVD/Blu-ray of Preta Gil was on 17 July 2010, in "Scala Rio," with a big party.

With the packed house at "The Week Rio", and an audience of about three thousand people, Gil celebrated the anniversary of her show and pre-release of his DVD/Blu-ray which hits stores in August: "It's eight-year career and three of them working on this show. Today I am an artist mature and aware enough of my segment. I have a wonderful staff and very nice experience every minute with this whole situation," Gil told the EGO during a conversation in the dressing room.

2013–present: 10 years anniversary and 2nd live DVD/Blu-ray 
Gil celebrated 10 years of her career with burning the DVD/Blu-ray, Bloco da Preta, which took place on the evening of Wednesday, 23 October 2013, at "Citibank Hall" in Rio de Janeiro. With a mix of Brazilian rhythms ranging from pop to swing, passing through funk, axé, pagode, and samba, the show had the participation of Lulu, Ivete Sangalo, Anitta, Israel and Thiago Novaes and had three hours of duração. Some songs had to be repeated due to the raspy voice of singer and errors in some letters. Master Pablo in front of the battery "Black Power" with 10 drummers and dancers on stage gave a special glow to the show.

"Every singer dreams about it, with this mega-production. I am very happy," said Gil, who despite having taken a physical therapist did not care about the knee problem, jumped in high heels and used during the presentation said "Only now can."

During Carnival 2014, South Korean singer, Psy sang alongside Gil along with Claudia Leitte, integrating programming of "Varanda Elétrica" the cabin "Expresso 2222".

For Carnival 2014, Gil performed 19 shows over 15 days. Your street block in the Marvelous City, the "Bloco da Preta" (Preta's Block), is the third-largest in the Rio de Janeiro and has already reached concentrate to 2.5 million people in the streets. To account for so much work, the singer is staffed by a team of diverse professionals. "Before he was afraid of the wardrobe, shoe, every detail. It caused me to pain Everything. Had remedy, analgesic and ice packs waiting for me at the exit of each show. Had two knee injuries in 2010 and 2012 carnivals. Today learned to delegate responsibility and caring for me. I osteopath, physiotherapist, Rodrigo (groom) as personal, speech therapist. useless But not so many people taking care of me if I did not care for it myself", she says, who claims not to leave more heavy routine to interfere with your health.

Discography

Studio albums

Live albums

Video albums

Singles

Featuring

Tours 
 2008–2011: Noite Preta
 2012–present: Baile da Preta

Block carnival 
 2009–present: Bloco da Preta

TV work 
Presenter and cast
 2010: Vai e Vem - (GNT)
 2005: Caixa Preta - (Band)
 2012: The Voice Brasil
 2012–present: Esquenta!
 2013: Fantástico

Online radio
 2010: Noite Preta FM

Actress
 2010: As Cariocas
 2010: Ti Ti Ti
 2009: Caminho das Índias
 2008: Ó Paí, Ó
 2008: Os Mutantes – Caminhos do Coração
 2007: Caminhos do Coração
 2003: Agora É que São Elas

Film
 2006: Over the Hedge – Stella (Brazilian voice)

Notes

References

External links 
 Official website
 

1974 births
Living people
Brazilian songwriters
Brazilian telenovela actresses
Brazilian television presenters
21st-century Brazilian women singers
Brazilian women television presenters
Pansexual women
Pansexual musicians
21st-century Brazilian LGBT people
Brazilian LGBT singers
Brazilian LGBT songwriters
Brazilian LGBT actors
Brazilian LGBT broadcasters